Peter Esben-Petersen (18 December 1869, in Sverup near Silkeborg – 2 April 1942, in Silkeborg) was a Danish entomologist who specialised in world Neuroptera. He was also interested in the Orthoptera, Ephemeroptera and other insects of Denmark. 
	
Esben-Petersen was a teacher in Silkeborg. He was associated with the entomological series Danmarks Flora og Fauna. For his scientific work on world fauna he received an honorary degree from the University of Copenhagen. His insect collection is largely conserved in the Zoological Museum in Copenhagen, with a part  in the Natural History Museum in Aarhus :da:Naturhistorisk Museum).

Works
Partial list 
— (1902), "Bidrag til en Fortegnelse over Arktisk Norges Neuropterfauna I". Tromsø Museums Aarshefter (25): 119 – 153 
— (1908–09), "Bidrag til en Fortegnelse over Arktisk Norges Neuropterfauna II." Tromsø Museums Aarshefter, (31/32): 75 – 89 

 
— (1933), Bidrag til en Fortegnelse over Bornholms Insektfauna: Orthoptera, Plecoptera, Ephemeroptera, Odonata, Copeognatha, Neuroptera, Mecoptera, Trichoptera.Entomologiske Meddelelser 18: 215–238

References
Henriksen, K. L. 1937 [Esben-Petersen, P.] Ent. Meddel.  København 15 (11/12 499–506, Portrait
Nonveiller, G. 1999 The Pioneers of the research on the Insects of Dalmatia. Zagreb, Hrvatski Pridodoslovni Muzej : 1–390, 65 Fig.

External links
  Partial bibliography
EOL Encyclopedia of Life Taxa described by Esben-Petersen.Complete.Type Esben-Petersen into the search box.
SDEI Portrait, further details

Danish entomologists
1942 deaths
1869 births
People from Silkeborg